Križ is a village and a municipality of western Moslavina, located southeast from Zagreb, near Ivanić-Grad. In the 2011 Croatian census, the population of the Križ municipality numbers 6,963 people, with 1,821 residents in the village itself.

Settlements

The total municipality population is 6,963, distributed in the following settlements:

 Bunjani, population 636
 Donji Prnjarovec, population 71
 Gornji Prnjarovec, population 369
 Johovec, population 144
 Konšćani, population 166
 Križ, population 1,821
 Mala Hrastilnica, population 91
 Novoselec, population 1,362
 Obedišće, population 580
 Okešinec, population 422
 Razljev, population 131
 Rečica Kriška, population 346
 Širinec, population 256
 Šušnjari, population 133
 Velika Hrastilnica, population 166
 Vezišće, population 269

History

Križ is an historic place and centre of "Ivanić region". The history of Križ, or "Križ pod Obedom" as it was once called, is closely tied to the history of "Ivanić Grad and Kloštar Ivanić", even though Križ has some unique roots, too. As customary in the past, the place was named after a sacral monument – the church of the Assumption of the Holy Cross. "Križ" (meaning Cross) is indirectly mentioned for the first time in 1334 when it was recorded as one of Zagreb Diocese parishes.

Until 1918, Križ (named MILITAER KRIZ before 1850) was part of the Austrian monarchy (Kingdom of Croatia-Slavonia after the compromise of 1867), in the Croatian Military Frontier, Warasdin-Kreutzer Regiment  N°V. In 1920, the town was the centre of peasant rebellion.

Monuments and Sightseeings
Archaeological finds in Sipćina, near Okešinec, tells us that people used to inhabit this region very early in the past.
 
In the fire that caught the old parish church in 1714 the central altar was burnt and six years later in 1720 it was replaced with a new altar featuring priceless wooden sculptures one of the most beautiful in the whole northern Croatia. Valuable are also pieces made of gold from the 18th and 19th centuries. Around the church there is a hundred-year old park created in 1894 as an imitation of the English landscape architecture.

Economy
On the southern municipality border there is the forest "Žutica" with oil field. The forest Veliki Jantak known as the hunting ground stretches to the east.

Today around 7,000 people live in 16 settlements of Križ municipality covering the area of 118 square kilometres. For the economy of the region the most important companies are DIN Novoselec and Elektra Križ (Electric power distribution company). When Croatia became an independent state, new possibilities were offered and today there exist many new privately owned businesses.

Education
Education has always had an important role in the region. A school existed as far back as the 17th century. It was the church school. In 1790 the first general public school was opened and in 1884 the library and reading-room.

Notable people
Milka Trnina, an opera singer, was born in Vezišće, a village located in the Križ municipality.

References

External links

DIN Novoselec
Križ tourist blog

Populated places in Zagreb County
Municipalities of Croatia